American gospel singer Yolanda Adams has released 11 studio albums, 2 live albums and 6 compilation albums. With sales of nearly 10 million records worldwide, she was Billboard's Top Gospel Artist of the 2000s and has sold 4.5 million albums in the US since 1991. Adams is referred as the "First Lady of Modern Gospel" by the media. She has spawned 5 No. 1 albums on Billboard's Top Gospel Albums. The Gospel Music Association inducted her into the Gospel Music Hall of Fame. Mountain High... Valley Low remains her best-selling album in the US, being certified Platinum by RIAA, while her albums "Believe" and "Verity Presents: The Best of Yolanda Adams" both reached gold status respectively.

Albums

Compilations

Notable singles

Videography

DVD/video releases
 Yolanda Adams Live in Concert - An Unforgettable Evening (DVD, 2002 reissue)
 Yolanda Live: The Unforgettable Evening: Volume One (VHS)
 Yolanda Adams Live in Washington D.C.: Volume Two (VHS)
 Shakin' The House... Live In L.A. (VHS) (1998) ("Even Me," "You Know that I Know," "I'll Always Remember," and "The Lord is With Us in This Place")
 Come Together - A Night for John Lennon's Words and Music (2001) ("Imagine")
 The Concert for World Children's Day (2002) ("I Believe I Can Fly")
 A Clay Aiken Christmas (2004) ("Oh Holy Night," "Santa Claus Is Coming to Town" (w/Clay Aiken and Barry Manilow) and "Because It's Christmas" (w/Aiken and Manilow))
 Hopeville (2008) - (w/Donnie McClurkin and Kirk Franklin) (DVD)

Music videos
 "Gotta Have Love" (Tribute, 1996)
 "Yeah" (Elektra, 1999)
 "Open My Heart" (Elektra, 1999)
 "I Believe I Can Fly" (Elektra, 2000)
 "Never Give Up" (Elektra, 2001)
 "Victory" (Atlantic, 2005)
 "This Too Shall Pass" (Atlantic, 2005)
 "Be Still" (N-House Music Group, 2012)

Filmography
 The Gospel (2005)
 Sweating in the Spirit (2005)
 "The Parkers" (2004)
 "A Clay Aiken Christmas" (TV) (2004)
 "Soul Food" (2004)

Collaborations and guest appearances

Other releases
Yolanda Adams Smooth Jazz Tribute
Artist: Various Artists
Release Date: March 13, 2007
Label: CC Ent/Copycats
Yolanda Adams at Her Very Best With the Southeast Inspirational Choir
Artist: Yolanda Adams & The Southeast Inspirational Choir
Release Date: 1993
Label: Paula

References

Other references

Yolanda Adams at Yahoo! Music

Discography
Discographies of American artists
Christian music discographies
Pop music discographies